John Mark Dutton Elvin (born 1938) is a professor emeritus of Chinese history at Australian National University, specializing in the late imperial period; he is also emeritus fellow of St Antony's College, Oxford.

Early life
Elvin, the only child of Lionel Elvin and Mona Bedortha Dutton, grew up in Cambridge; attended  The Dragon School; and matriculated as an undergraduate at King's College, Cambridge. He held posts at the University of Glasgow and at St, Antony's College, Oxford.

Career
He is noted for his high-level equilibrium trap theory to explain why an Industrial Revolution happened in Europe but not in China, despite the fact that the state of scientific knowledge was far more advanced in China much earlier than in Europe. Essentially, Elvin proposed that pre-industrial production methods were extremely efficient in China, which obviated much of the economic pressure for scientific progress. At the same time, a philosophical shift occurred, where Taoism was gradually replaced by Confucianism as the dominant intellectual paradigm, and moral philosophy and the development of rigid social organization became more important than scientific inquiry among intellectuals.

Works
Monographs
 The Pattern of the Chinese past: A social and economic interpretation (1973)
 Changing stories in the Chinese world (1997)
 The Retreat of the Elephants: An Environmental History of China (2006)

Other works
 Commerce and Society in Sung China (translation of Yoshinobu Shiba)
 Chinese Cities since the Sung Dynasty (1978)

See also
 Great Divergence

External links
 Interviewed by Alan Macfarlane 24 July 2012 (video)
Mark Elvin's home page at ANU
Mark Elvin's home page at Ruprecht-Karls-Universität Heidelberg

1938 births
Living people
Academic staff of the Australian National University
Historians of China
Australian sinologists
Australian historians
Fellows of St Antony's College, Oxford